CSKA is a station on the Bolshaya Koltsevaya line of the Moscow Metro. It opened on 26 February 2018 as one of five initial stations on the new line.

Passengers can make out-of-station transfers to Zorge on the Moscow Central Circle Line. The Metro plans to build a walkway between the stations which would make the connection time about 20 minutes.

Name
The original name of the station was slated to be Khodynskoe Pole, after the open area where the station is located; however, fans of CSKA Moscow requested that the station be renamed “CSKA” after the sports clubs whose facilities are nearby. In April 2016, the Mayor of Moscow, Sergey Sobyanin issued a decree to rename the station. To further recognize CSKA, the station lobby includes sculptures of well-known CSKA athletes across the club's three major sports: Vsevolod Bobrov, Denis Denisov, and Victor Khryapa.

References

Moscow Metro stations
Railway stations in Russia opened in 2018
Bolshaya Koltsevaya line
CSKA Moscow
Railway stations located underground in Russia